Walking Tall is a 2004 American action film directed by Kevin Bray. It is the remake of the 1973 film of the same name, and stars Dwayne Johnson (credited as The Rock) and Johnny Knoxville. The film revolves around a discharged U.S Army soldier, who returns to his hometown only to become the town's sheriff, when he finds that the town is laced with heinous crimes and corruption.

Plot
Former U.S. Army Special Forces Sergeant Chris Vaughn returns to his small home town in Kitsap County, Washington. Looking for work, he finds the local cedar mill was closed down three years prior by its owner, Jay Hamilton, who opened a  casino that now accounts for the majority of revenue for the local area. Hamilton, who was Chris' school friend, invites him to a night of fun at the casino. While checking out the VIP lounge, Chris stumbles upon his childhood friend Deni, who is now working as a stripper. He notices the craps dealer using loaded dice and demonstrates this to the patrons. When the floorman refuses to pay out, Chris instigates a fight. Although he beats most of the security guards, he is subdued with a cattle prod. In the basement, Hamilton's head of security, Booth, cuts Chris' torso with a utility knife and leaves him for dead.

After recuperating, Chris attempts to press charges, but Sheriff Stan Watkins refuses and says the casino is untouchable. Chris learns that his nephew, Pete, has overdosed on crystal meth, which was sold to his friends by the casino security guards. Furious, Chris arrives at the casino and, using a piece of lumber as a club, destroys casino property and brutally beats the security guards. Sheriff Watkins and his deputies apprehend Chris as he drives away.  In the ensuing trial, Hamilton's security and staff testify against Chris. When the judge allows Chris to present his defense, he fires his appointed attorney, whom he suspects to be working for Hamilton. Chris gives a civic speech about the town's former glory and promises to clean up the town if acquitted. To further emphasize his plea, Chris reveals the grotesque scars on his torso. Chris is acquitted and wins the election for sheriff.

Upon taking office, Chris summarily dismisses the entire police force and deputizes his friend, Ray Templeton.  Templeton, a former drug addict, teaches Chris about narcotics. Chris and Ray crack down on a supply spot and take Booth into custody. Despite stripping his truck into pieces in front of him, Booth reveals nothing. Chris assigns Ray to stand watch over his house in case Hamilton targets his family. Chris remains at the sheriff's office to supervise Booth. Deni visits him, brings him food, and reveals that she quit her job. Chris has sex with Deni. The next morning, Watkins and his deputies arrive at the Chris' office, blow up his truck, and fire upon the building with machine guns. Recognizing his dangerous predicament, Booth pleads for Chris to let him out of his cell. Chris uses the situation as leverage, and Booth reveals that the drug lab is in the cedar mill. Booth is immediately killed by the attackers' indiscriminate fire, but Chris kills the attackers with Deni's help. Chris' parents' house is attacked, but Ray and Chris' father dispatch the gunmen.  

After ensuring their safety, Chris heads for the mill. Hamilton, calmly waiting in a control room, attempts to kill Chris with the mill equipment. Chris drags Hamilton through a trap door with him, and the two fall through a chute. Chris, whose leg is injured, tends to his injury in a nearby forest before Hamilton attacks him with an axe. Chris cripples Hamilton and arrests him. With Ray's assistance, Chris shuts down the casino and reopens the cedar mill.

Cast
 Dwayne Johnson (credited as The Rock) as Chris Vaughn Jr, an Army veteran who runs for sheriff in an effort to clean up his hometown
 Both the character and the story are based on Sheriff Buford Pusser and his time as sheriff of McNairy County, Tennessee. The film is dedicated to his memory.
 Johnny Knoxville as Ray Templeton, Chris' friend and former convict who is deputized by Chris
 Neal McDonough as Jay Hamilton, Chris' former friend and owner of the casino. He is also the head of the drug trade in the town
 Michael Bowen as Sheriff Stan Watkins, a corrupt sheriff who allows Hamilton and his men to run the casino undisturbed as a front for their drug dealing
 Kevin Durand as Booth, the head of security at the casino and one of Hamilton's dealers
 Kristen Wilson as Michelle Vaughn, Chris' sister and paramedic
 Ashley Scott as Deni, Chris' friend and love interest who worked at the casino as a stripper
 Barbara Tarbuck as Connie Vaughn, Chris' mother
 Khleo Thomas as Pete Vaughn, Michelle's son and Chris' nephew
 John Beasley as Chris Vaughn Sr, Chris' father
 Cobie Smulders as Exotic Beauty, one of the employees at the casino

Reception
Based on 136 reviews collected by the film review aggregator Rotten Tomatoes, 26% of critics gave Walking Tall a positive review, with an average rating of 5.4/10. The site's critics consensus reads: "The Rock makes a competent hero, but the movie is content to let a 2×4 do all the talking." Metacritic gave the film a score of 44 out of 100 based on 31 critics, indicating "mixed or average reviews". Audiences polled by CinemaScore gave the film an average grade of "B+" on an A+ to F scale.

The film grossed $57 million worldwide, with a budget of $46 million.

Sequel
Walking Tall: The Payback and Walking Tall: Lone Justice are two  direct-to-video sequels that have been released starring Kevin Sorbo.

See also
 Vigilante film

References

External links
 
 
 
 
 

Walking Tall (films)
2004 films
2004 action films
Remakes of American films
WWE Studios films
Films shot in Vancouver
Films set in Washington (state)
Films directed by Kevin Bray (director)
Hyde Park Entertainment films
Mandeville Films films
Metro-Goldwyn-Mayer films
Films scored by Graeme Revell
Films about United States Army Special Forces
American action films
American vigilante films
2000s vigilante films
Films produced by David Hoberman
2000s English-language films
2000s American films